Soul Cages may refer to

 "The Soul Cages" (story), an 1828 short story by Thomas Keightley.
 The Soul Cages, a 1991 album by Sting including the song of the same name.
 Soul Cages (film), a 1999 short film by Phillip Barker
 Soul Cages: The Story of Life, Death and Beyond, a 2012 bharatanatyam dance theater presentation by Savitha Sastry